Tmesisternus excellens is a species of beetle in the family Cerambycidae. It was described by Per Olof Christopher Aurivillius. It is known from Papua New Guinea.

Subspecies
 Tmesisternus excellens excellens Aurivillius, 1908
 Tmesisternus excellens albosignatus Gahan, 1916

References

excellens